Mile Mijušković (born 8 October 1985) is a Montenegrin handball player for BM Torrelavega and the Montenegrin national team.

References

External links

1985 births
Living people
Montenegrin male handball players
Sportspeople from Nikšić
Expatriate handball players
Montenegrin expatriate sportspeople in Slovenia
Montenegrin expatriate sportspeople in Spain
Liga ASOBAL players
Mediterranean Games competitors for Montenegro
Competitors at the 2018 Mediterranean Games